El amor brujo (Love, the Magician, or Wedded by Witchcraft) or Carlos Saura Dance Trilogy, Part 3: El Amor Brujo is a 1986 Spanish musical film written and directed  by Carlos Saura. It was directed and choreographed in the flamenco style by Maria Pagès. It is the third part of the Saura's flamenco trilogy he made in the 1980s, after Bodas de sangre in 1981 and Carmen in 1983. The film was screened out of competition at the 1986 Cannes Film Festival.

The film is based on El amor brujo composed by Manuel de Falla.

Plot summary
Candela, who is loved by Carmelo, marries José in a pre-arranged marriage decided by their respective fathers. José is in love with the flirtatious Lucía and dies defending her honor. Carmelo is mistakenly arrested for the killing, and spends several years in prison. After being released, he declares his love for Candela.

Although Candela is now "free" to marry Carmelo she is haunted (and obsessed) by the ghost of José, who reappears every night to dance with her.  Candela, while speaking with Lucía, learns that José pursued her even after he married Candela. She renounces him, but is unable to shake his hold on her. Tía Rosario provides the solution - Lucia must dance with José, an act which will exorcise his ghost forever. It is never made clear if Lucía actually gives up her life to join him, but she never reappears in the film after their dance scene.

Soundtrack
The film fleshed out the story with spoken dialogue and several songs, but used the entire score of the ballet. The Orquesta Nacional de España was conducted by Jesús López-Cobos. The singer heard on the soundtrack was the late Rocío Jurado. A soundtrack album, now out of print, was issued by EMI.

Cast
 Antonio Gades	as Carmelo
 Cristina Hoyos as Candela
 Laura del Sol	as Lucía
 Juan Antonio Jiménez as José
 Emma Penella as Tía Rosario
 La Polaca	as Pastora
 Gómez de Jerez as El Lobo/Cantaores
 Enrique Ortega as Padre de José
 Diego Pantoja	as Padre de Candela
 Giovana as Rocío
 Maria Campano	(as Mari Campano)
 Candy Román as Chulo
 Enrique Pantoja
 Manolo Sevilla as Cantaores
 Antonio Solera as Guitarrista
 Manuel Rodríguez as Guitarrista
 Juan Manuel Roldán as Guitarrista

See also
 Bewitched Love (1967)

References

External links
 

1986 films
1980s Spanish-language films
Films directed by Carlos Saura
1980s musical films
Flamenco films
1980s dance films